

Pro career
 Played in 2006 and 2007 for the Amsterdam Admirals in NFL Europe.
 Recorded 3 tackles on defense and 4 special teams stops as a rookie
 Originally assigned to the Admirals at the conclusion of a week-long minicamp for international players in Tampa, Florida, in February, 2006.
 Made his first pro start for the Amsterdam Admirals in 2007.

Amateur
 Considered one of the Top Junior Prospects in Dutch Club American Football as a LB
 Played for the Netherlands´ National Junior Team - Dutch Junior Lions
 Played flag football for the Amstelland Panthers and youth tackle for the Amsterdam Crusaders before attracting the attention of NFLE scouts
 Won the 2003 Youth American Football League of the Netherlands in an unbeaten Championship Year for Coach Patrick Lashley with the Amsterdam Crusaders.
 After the demise of the NFL Europe league, returned to amateur football in 2007 with the Amsterdam Crusaders
 Won the 2008 and 2009 editions of the Tulip Bowl, the Dutch National Championship, with the Amsterdam Crusaders, leading in tackles in both championship games.
 Appeared in 2009 EFAF Cup semi-final with the Amsterdam Crusaders

Personal
 Attended O.S.B. High School in Amsterdam
 Nicknamed Kwaz or Bigs

External links
Just Sports Stats

1986 births
Living people
American football linebackers
Amsterdam Admirals players
Dutch players of American football
Sportspeople from Amsterdam